Carpophilus melanopterus is a species of sap-feeding beetles in the family Nitidulidae. It is found in Central America and North America.

References

 Parsons, Carl T. (1943). "A revision of Nearctic Nitidulidae (Coleoptera)". Bulletin of the Museum of Comparative Zoology, vol. 92, no. 3, 121–278.
 Price, Michele B., and Daniel K. Young (2006). "An annotated checklist of Wisconsin sap and short-winged flower beetles (Coleoptera: Nitidulidae, Kateretidae)". Insecta Mundi, vol. 20, no. 1-2, 69–84.

Further reading

 NCBI Taxonomy Browser, Carpophilus melanopterus
 Arnett, R.H. Jr., M. C. Thomas, P. E. Skelley and J. H. Frank. (eds.). (2002). American Beetles, Volume II: Polyphaga: Scarabaeoidea through Curculionoidea. CRC Press LLC, Boca Raton, FL.
 Arnett, Ross H. (2000). American Insects: A Handbook of the Insects of America North of Mexico. CRC Press.
 Richard E. White. (1983). Peterson Field Guides: Beetles. Houghton Mifflin Company.

Nitidulidae
Beetles described in 1843